Darcy Taimua Swain (born 5 July 1997) is an Australian rugby union player who plays for the  in the Super Rugby. His position of choice is lock.

Debuting for the Australian National Rugby Team in 2021 in the series against France, he was brought to fame by a turnover in the late stages of the game, securing Australia's victory.

Early life 
Born in the north Queensland town of Babinda, Swain grew up in nearby Cairns until he was 15, when he was scouted by Brisbane Boys' College and offered a scholarship to finish his schooling there. During his final year of school, the Brumbies offered Swain a move to Canberra to play for the Brumbies U20s team, and ultimately the National Rugby Championship team Canberra Vikings.

Career  
In 2017, Swain was included in the Brumbies' squad for a friendly in Singapore. He made his Super Rugby debut in 2018.

References

External links 
 Darcy Swain at Wallabies
 Darcy Swain at ItsRugby.co.uk
 Darcy Swain at ESPNscrum

Australian rugby union players
Australia international rugby union players
1997 births
Living people
Rugby union players from Brisbane
Rugby union locks
Canberra Vikings players
ACT Brumbies players